= Cinidius of Vic =

Bishop of Vic, Spain

Cinidius was the first bishop of Vic who is mentioned by name in records that have come down to the present. He was involved in the council of Tarragona and Girona in 516.
